Hyda is a genus of moths in the subfamily Arctiinae. The genus was erected by Francis Walker in 1854.

Species
 Hyda basilutea (Walker, 1854)
 Hyda excelsa Rothschild, 1931

References

External links

Arctiinae